Pennsylvania Route 729 (PA 729) is a , north–south state highway located in Clearfield County, Pennsylvania.  The southern terminus is at PA 253/PA 453 in Gulich Township.  The northern terminus is at US 219/PA 879 in Grampain.

Route description

PA 729 is known by two names along its route.  The two names it goes by are Main Street, and more commonly, the Tyrone Turnpike.

The route begins at the village of Janesville at an intersection of PA 253/PA 453.  The route heads northwest to the borough of Glen Hope, where the route has an intersection with PA 53.  The route continues north to the village of Lumber City.  In the village, the route has a short concurrency with PA 969.  The route continues north to the borough of Grampian, where the route terminates at an intersection with US 219 and PA 879.

History
PA 729 was first signed in 1930, but as a short route in Berks County, from PA 100 (Then PA 62) to PA 29.  In the mid-1940s, the route was decommissioned, but in 1969, the route number was revived for its current location today.  A very small portion of the current route was signed as PA 825 during the 1930s and early 1940s.

Major intersections

See also

References

External links 

Pennsylvania Highways: PA 729

729
Transportation in Clearfield County, Pennsylvania